Bettini is a surname of Italian origin and it may refer to:

Alessandro Bettini (1821–1898), Italian tenor involved in the UK legal case of Bettini v Gye
Amalia Bettini (1809–1894), Italian stage actress
Antonio Bettini (1396–1487), Italian clergyman and writer
Carlos Bettini (born 1951), Argentinian businessman, politician, and diplomat
Décimo Bettini (1910–1982), Italian racing cyclist
Domenico Bettini (1644–1705), Italian painter of the Baroque era
Gianni Bettini (1860–1938), Italian-American builder of phonographs
Goffredo Bettini (born 1952), Italian politician, founding member of the Democratic Party (PD)
Gonzalo Bettini (born 1992), Argentine footballer
Lorenzo Bettini (1931–2008), Italian professional football player
Mariano Bettini (born 1996), Argentine professional footballer
Mario Bettini (1582–1657), Italian Jesuit philosopher, mathematician and astronomer
Maurizio Bettini (born 1947), Italian philologist, anthropologist and novelist
Paolo Bettini (born 1974), Italian road-racing bicyclist
Pietro Bettini (fl. 17th century), Italian engraver of the Baroque era
Sergio Bettini (1905–1986), Italian art historian
Thomas Bettini, former member of American rock back Jackyl
Virginio Bettini (1942–2020), Italian politician
Zelia Trebelli-Bettini (1838–1892), French opera singer

Italian-language surnames